Dorymyrmex antillana is a species of ant in the genus Dorymyrmex. Described by Snelling in 2005, the species is endemic to Puerto Rico and the Dominican Republic, where they nest in open sandy areas.

References

Dorymyrmex
Hymenoptera of North America
Insects described in 2005